Markar Khan Davidkhanian was the Minister of Finance of Iran, a close advisor to Fath-Ali Shah Qajar, the second King of Qajar Iran, and a member of the Davidkhanian family. As Finance Minister, Davidkhanian shaped Iranian economic policy during the Great Game.

Biography 
Prior to his duties in the court, Davidkhanian was educated abroad in England at Cambridge. Davidkhanian served as the financial supervisor or Chief of Procurement to Fath-Ali Shah Qajar for forty-four years, from 1804 to 1848. It was noted that he performed his duties with accuracy. He also served as the Minister of Finance of Iran for fifteen years.  

Davidkhanian was appointed Chief Financial Advisor in 1804, a year after the Russo-Persian War had begun, which was a struggle for supremacy in Transcaucasia dating back to the empires of Peter the Great and Nader Shah. Both Tsar Alexander and Fath-Ali Shah hoped to consolidate disputed territory in Georgia. Although Persia had the numerical advantage on the battlefield, Russia had superior technology, training, and strategy. Despite the Persian alliance with Napoleon, France could provide little concrete help to Persia, and in early 1813 Persia signed the Treaty of Gulistan, ceding what is modern-day Dagestan, Georgia, and large parts of the Republic of Azerbaijan. Russia also gained trade rights within Persia.

Although peace reigned for thirteen years after the war, the Persian economy was in shambles, forcing Davidkhanian to rely on foreign subsidies. In July 1826, Russia occupied Mirak, violating the Treaty of Gulistan and reigniting war between the two powers. Persia signed the Treaty of Turkmenchay to end the war in February 1828, which forced Davidkhanian to pay 20 million rubles in silver. As Russia increased its sphere of influence in Iran, Davidkhanian attempted to stem the flow of the Shah's dwindling finances, organized foreign loans, and managed domestic economic instability.

References

People of Qajar Iran
Qajar civil servants
19th-century Iranian politicians